"Parla con me" ("Talk to Me") is a 2009 song by Italian singer-songwriter Eros Ramazzotti and the first single released from his eleventh studio album Ali e radici. The track was co-written and produced by Claudio Guidetti and Adelio Cogliati, who also wrote previous hits for Eros, including "Cose della vita", "Un'altra te", etc.

Music video
The video of the song was filmed in Los Angeles by the director Marc Klasfeld. Most likely east of Palm Springs outside of Twentynine Palms area

"Dímelo a mí"
As is traditional with many other successful releases of Ramazzotti songs, he released a Spanish language parallel release for Spain, Mexico, Latin America and USA Latin markets titled "Dímelo a mí" (meaning Tell It to Me). That version appears in the parallel Spanish-language version to the album Ali e radici retitled Alas y raíces

Charts

Year-end charts

References

2009 singles
Eros Ramazzotti songs
Songs written by Eros Ramazzotti
Songs written by Claudio Guidetti
2009 songs
Songs written by Michele Canova
Song recordings produced by Michele Canova